The Dr. Horacio E. Oduber Hospital (abbreviated as HOH) is a 320-bed hospital on the island of Aruba, founded in 1976 by the non-profit foundation Stichting Ziekenverpleging Aruba. It is the one of two hospitals on the island.

History

The hospital is named after the first Aruban physician, who treated patients at his home (Quinta del Carmen) before the first hospital (San Pedro de Verona) was opened by catholic nuns in 1920. San Pedro de Verona hospital was converted into a nursing home in 1977 when Dr. Horacio Oduber Hospital started receiving its first patients. Between 1938 and 1985 the Lago oil refinery in San Nicolas owned a second hospital, who served primarily its employees, their families and privately insured citizens.  It wasn't until 1985 when the Lago hospital was closed, that HOH served as the only hospital on the island for the next 35 years, until April 2021, when Instituto Medico San Nicolas (ImSan) expended to a 22-bed in-patient facility.[19]

HOH is a modern medical facility and a level III  trauma center.

Location and accessibility
HOH is located in the area of Eagle Beach in Oranjestad, Aruba, right in front of the low-rise hotel area, and within 5 minutes of the high-rise hotel-strip at Palm Beach. The hospital is easily accessible by major highways, including the Sasaki-corridor and the Kibaima-Tanki Flip roadway, which connects the largest urban areas of Aruba. The furthest urban areas are within 25 minutes of HOH by ground ambulance, while the distance to most rural areas can be up to 45 minutes by road. The hospital has an active helipad with all procedures in place to receive patients by police and coastguard helicopters.

Medical staff
The medical facilities available at the hospital include family medicine, general surgery, internal medicine, neurology, neuro-surgery, orthopedic surgery, pediatrics, genecology, cardiology, intervention cardiology, nephrology, gastro-enterology, anesthesiology, ophthalmology, bariatric surgery, otolaryngology, psychiatry, oncology, pathology, intensive care medicine, plastic surgery, dermatology, obstetrics, pulmonology, radiology and urology.
Specialized physicians are either contracted by HOH or work privately as independent consultants. HOH and the public health insurance company AZV have agreements in place to refer patients to ImSan in San Nicolas, for selected oncology and ophthalmology treatments, including surgical procedures and radiotherapy.

Aruba does not offer any undergraduate medical training. All physicians at HOH are graduates of medical schools in Europe (mainly the Netherlands) or Latin America. However HOH collaborates with Dutch universities and university medical centers for short-term placements of medical students and resident physicians, as well as the post-graduate training of family physicians.[20]

Nurses are from selected Dutch universities of applied sciences and a locally established vocational nursing school. Post-graduate nursing training including the Dutch specialist diploma programs in Intensive Care nursing or Emergency Care Nursing are organized periodically in collaboration with Dutch university hospitals.

The nursing and paramedical staff at HOH include individuals from Europe, Latin America and Central America, which creates a unique multi-lingual environment. Patients and staff communicate in English, Dutch, Spanish and Papiamento. The official language of documentation is Dutch and English.

Services

Diagnostic departments
Electrophysiology, ultrasound, x-ray, mammography, CAT-scan, MRI, performance tests, laparoscopy, endoscopy, bronchoscopy, coronary angiography,  pathology, serology, clinical chemistry, microbiology, among others.

Treatment facilities
Rehabilitation center, physical therapy unit,  obstetrical unit, walk-in clinic, emergency department, out-patient clinic, wound care center, diabetes center, pain clinic, oncology day-care unit,  surgical theater (5 operating rooms),  blood bank,  Cath lab, post-anesthesia unit.

Admission departments
Psychiatric unit, intensive care unit, medium care unit, coronary care unit, short-stay center, medical wards, surgical wards, isolation nursing units, multiple specialty wards, maternity ward, pediatric ward, basic neonatological  care.

Referral of care and inter-hospital agreements

HOH, through the public health insurance agency AZV, has agreements with selected tertiary referral hospitals in Colombia and sends out several patients a year for specialized treatment to nearby cities like Bucaramanga, Medellin, Cali and Barranquilla. Common referrals are related to intervention-cardiology, thoracic surgery, cardiovascular surgery, complex neurosurgery, neonatology intensive care, high risk obstetrics and perinatology, some cases of oncology, complex trauma surgery and reconstructive surgery and treatment that can only be given in a burn center. Oncological cases are sent to ImSan in the Eastern part of the island or to the radio-therapy facility of the Sint Elisabeth Hospital in Curaçao. Divers with decompression sickness are sent to Bonaire to the Fundashon Mariadal in Bonaire. Candidates for organ transplantation or complex maxillofacial surgery and patients with growth and puberty disorders are also referred to the mainland or the Netherlands.
At the same time, HOH frequently receives patients from smaller hospitals from Caribbean Netherlands, Curaçao and Sint Maarten, as particularly intensive care beds and neonatology incubators are limited.  
HOH also receives daily referrals from the Intituto Medico San Nicolas (ImSan), a large out-patient facility in the San Nicolas area that obtained hospital status in 2021, and which has an in-patient admission capacity of 22 beds and attends approximately 16.000 patients each year through its emergency department. Patient transfers from and to Aruba are conducted by air ambulance companies based in Bogota, Colombia and Bonaire.

Recent developments
A recently renovated wing houses a combined intensive care, medium care and coronary car unit, which has a flexible capacity of 12 beds.
There are existing plans to renovate the main building and expand the hospital with a three-story wing, which will house all services related to mother and child care and a new out-patient clinic.

A large expansion and renovation project started in September 2014 and was due to finish in 2019, but was delayed by the covid-19 pandemic. The project included a new emergency department, an expansion of the operating theaters and the post anesthesia unit and the construction of a new hybrid cardiac catheterization laboratory. A six-story tower was built to house the ICU, Maturnity, Pediatrics and Cardio patient rooms. The 10000 square meters of new space will house a new outpatient clinic, three hospitalization wards of thirty patient rooms each, and a new 'mother and child center' that will house the delivery suits, the pediatrics ward and the maternity ward. The old building will be renovated.

On April 13, 2020, the hospital announced that the original ICU capacity of 6 beds had been significantly increased as a result of the 2020 coronavirus pandemic in Aruba. The hospital had already increased its capacity to 21, and after a shipment of emergency aid  now has a total of 33 ICU beds.

Accidents
On June 16, 2020, an explosion and subsequent structure fire was reported in one of the new buildings of HOH. The incident triggered a large-scale emergency response, including the evacuation of patients and the deployment of 20 Dutch Marines from the 32 Raiding Squadron. [21][22] No injuries or fatalities were reported and all services, including elective surgeries were resumed four days later.

References

External links
 Official site

Hospitals in Aruba
1976 establishments in Aruba
Hospitals established in 1976
Buildings and structures in Oranjestad, Aruba
20th-century architecture in the Netherlands